Leipoldtville is a town in Cederberg Local Municipality in the Western Cape province of South Africa.

It is located  West-Southwest of Clanwilliam and  Southeast of Lambert's Bay. The town is named after the Reverend C F Leipoldt, a Dutch Reformed minister in Clanwilliam from 1884 to 1910 and father of the Afrikaans poet C. Louis Leipoldt.

References

Populated places in the Cederberg Local Municipality
Populated places established in 1905
1905 establishments in the Cape Colony